Almah (Hebrew: עַלְמָה) is a Hebrew word for a young woman of childbearing age.

Almah or Almeh may alo refer to:

Almah (band), a Brazilian metal band
Almah (album), 2006
Almah (Egyptian dancer) (Arabic: عالمة), or Almeh, a class of courtesans in Egypt
Almah Jane Frisby (1857—1931), an American physician and university professor
Alma, Israel (Hebrew: עַלְמָה)
Almeh Rural District (Persian: دهستان آلمه), in North Khorasan Province, Iran
Ibrahim Alma (Arabic: ابراهيم عالمة) (born 1991), a Syrian footballer

See also

Alma (disambiguation)